Nyenga is an urban division of one of the municipalities in Buikwe District, in the Central Region of Uganda. Nyenga Division is one of the three divisions of the city of Njeru. The other two divisions are Wakisi Division and Njeru Division.

Location
The coordinates of Nyenga, Uganda are:0°22'48.0"N; 33°09'00.0"E (Latitude:0.3800; Longitude:33.1500).

Population
In 2015, Uganda Bureau of Statistics (UBOS) estimated the population of Nyenga Division at 50,400. In 2020, the population agency estimated the mid-year population of Nyenga at 55,600 inhabitants. Of these, 28,200 (50.7 percent) were females and 27,400 (49.3 percent) were males. UBOS calculated that the population of Nyenga increased at an average rate of 2.0 percent annually, between 2015 and 2020.

Points of interest
The following points of interest lie within or near Nyenga:
(a) Nyenga Roman Catholic Church (b) Nyenga Mission Hospital, also St. Francis Hospital Nyenga, is a 75-bed community hospital that was founded in 1932 as a leprosarium.
Owned by the Roman Catholic Diocese of Lugazi. (c) Saint Joseph Minor Seminary Nyenga (d) Saint Francis School of Nursing and Midwifery and (e) Nyenga Children’s Home In Uganda, an extended family for destitute children.

The Mukono–Kyetume–Katosi–Nyenga Road passes through Nyenga in a general southwest to northeast direction on the way to the Source of the Nile Bridge.

See also
Buikwe
Buikwe District
Hospitals in Uganda
Central Region, Uganda

References

External links
 Dr Peregrine Kibuuka: My life in Nyenga Published On 6 January 2012.

Populated places in Central Region, Uganda
Cities in the Great Rift Valley
Buikwe District